Abbasabad (also Romanized as ‘Abbāsābād) is a village in Rostaq Rural District, in the Central District of Neyriz County, Fars Province, Iran. At the 2006 census, its population was 236, in 53 families.

References 

Populated places in Neyriz County